The Dirt Road is the eighth studio album by American country music band Sawyer Brown. Released in 1992, it features the singles "The Dirt Road" and "Some Girls Do", both of which charted in the Top 5 on the Hot Country Singles & Tracks charts in 1992. "The Walk", a single from their previous album Buick, is also reprised here.

Track listing

Personnel 
Sawyer Brown
 Mark Miller – lead vocals
 Gregg "Hobie" Hubbard – keyboards, backing vocals 
 Duncan Cameron – lead guitars, dobro, mandolin, steel guitar, backing vocals
 Jim Scholten – bass
 Joe "Curley" Smyth – drums, percussion

Additional Musicians
 John Barlow Jarvis – keyboards, acoustic piano 
 Mike Lawler – keyboards, synthesizers 
 Steve Nathan – keyboards
 Bill Payne – keyboards
 Tommy Patterson – keyboards, backing vocals 
 Bill Hinds – guitars, backing vocals 
 Mac McAnally – guitars, backing vocals 
 Randy Scruggs – guitars 
 JayDee Maness – steel guitar 
 Earl Scruggs – banjo (1)
 David Hood – bass 
 Roger Hawkins – drums, percussion
 Paul Leim – drums, percussion 
 Terry McMillan – harmonica, percussion

Production 
 Mark Miller – producer 
 Randy Scruggs – producer 
 Steve Melton – recording 
 Ron "Snake" Reynolds – recording, mixing (2-11)
 Chuck Ainlay – overdub recording, mixing (1)
 Jay Johnson – assistant remix engineer 
 Milan Bogdan – digital editing 
 Glenn Meadows – mastering 
 Buddy Jackson – art direction, design 
 Chaim Mekel – photography

Chart performance

References

1992 albums
Curb Records albums
Sawyer Brown albums